Khun may refer to:

Khun (long vowel, middle tone) is the colloquial Thai name for the Golden Shower Tree.
Khun (courtesy title) (short vowel, middle tone) is a common Thai honorific
Khun (noble title) (short vowel, rising tone) is a former royally bestowed Thai noble title
Khun, Iran, a village in Bushehr Province, Iran

See also 
KHUN, an American radio station
Thai name